Greg Selkoe is an American entrepreneur and founder of XSET. He previously founded the streetwear e-commerce company Karmaloop and served as the president of FaZe Clan.

Early life and education

Selkoe is the son of Dennis J. Selkoe and Polly Selko and grew up in Jamaica Plain. He was expelled from The Park School and attended other public and private schools before graduation from a boarding school. He went to attend Rollins College in Florida where he earned a Bachelor of Arts before returning to Boston in 1996. He also earned a master's degree in Public Policy from Harvard Kennedy School.

Career

Selkoe launched Karmaloop in 2000 while still working as an urban planner with the Boston Redevelopment Authority. It began as a streetwear e-commerce company and grew into brick and mortar store opened in Boston in 2005. The company was sold to Shiekh Shoes in 2016.

In 2017, Selkoe launched Wanderset.com, a men's fashion brand website. The same year, he became the president of FaZe Clan in 2017, working for the company until he left in 2020. He cited his reason for leaving as the male-centric culture of gaming which did not reflect racial and gender diversity. He went on to found XSET where he works as the company's CEO.

References

External links
 LinkedIn profile

People from Jamaica Plain
Rollins College alumni
Harvard Kennedy School alumni
Businesspeople from Massachusetts
Living people

Year of birth missing (living people)